Koyamah  is a town and sub-prefecture in the Macenta Prefecture in the Nzérékoré Region of south-eastern Guinea.

References

Sub-prefectures of the Nzérékoré Region